Xceed is a provider of software components and tools for the Microsoft .NET platform. It offers a broad range of software components and tools that appeal to .NET, Windows Forms, WPF, Silverlight and ASP.NET developers for building better applications. Xceed is best known for its zip compression libraries and data grid controls, used by Microsoft in Microsoft Office 2007, Team Foundation Server 2010, Windows Home Server and Flight Simulator among others.

Xceed is a registered trademark in the software domain owned by Xceed.

Products 

 Xceed DataGrid for WPF - Xceed DataGrid for WPF offers rich in-place editing, complete with versatile, themed and themable editor controls for all forms of data types.
 Xceed Business Suite for WPF - This collection of carefully designed WPF controls fills in WPF holes and also includes the most-adopted and modified WPF datagrid in the industry. Includes Windows 10, Metro, Workplace, Windows 8 and Windows 7, and several designs produced by original designers.
 Xceed Data Manipulation Suite - Offers data compression (.NET/ASP.NET, ActiveX, Xamarin), Zip, Streaming, FTP, FTPS, SFTP, document manipulation, file transfer, encryption and encoding.

References

External links

Software companies of Canada
Companies based in Longueuil
Canadian companies established in 1994
1994 establishments in Quebec